This is a list of candidates for the 1885 New South Wales colonial election. The election was held from 16 October to 31 October 1885.

This was the last election at which there was no recognisable party structure.

Retiring Members

David Buchanan MLA (Mudgee)
George Campbell MLA (Carcoar)
Henry Cohen MLA (West Maitland)
Edward Combes MLA (East Macquarie)
George De Salis MLA (Queanbeyan)
James Farnell MLA (New England) — appointed to the Legislative Council
Alfred Fremlin MLA (Redfern)
Samuel Gray MLA (Richmond)
John Harris MLA (South Sydney)
William Hutchinson MLA (Balmain)
Auber Jones MLA (Murrumbidgee)
Leyser Levin MLA (Hume)
George Loughnan MLA (Murrumbidgee)
William McCourt MLA (Camden)
David Ryrie MLA (Monaro)
Sir Alexander Stuart MLA (Illawarra)
James Watson MLA (Gundagai)

Legislative Assembly
Sitting members are shown in bold text. Successful candidates are highlighted.

Electorates are arranged chronologically from the day the poll was held. Because of the sequence of polling, some sitting members who were defeated in their constituencies were then able to contest other constituencies later in the polling period. On the second occasion, these members are shown in italic text.

See also
 Members of the New South Wales Legislative Assembly, 1885–1887

References
 

1885